Hursh Road Bridge (Bridge No. 38) was a historic Whipple truss bridge spanning Cedar Creek near Cedarville, Allen County, Indiana.  It was built in 1879 by the Western Bridge Works of Fort Wayne, Indiana.  It was a 120 foot long, 16 feet wide ornate iron bridge.

It was added to the National Register of Historic Places in 1981 and delisted in 1993.

References

Bridges completed in 1879
Transportation buildings and structures in Allen County, Indiana
Former National Register of Historic Places in Indiana
Road bridges in Indiana
Whipple truss bridges in the United States
1879 establishments in Indiana